Springwater School was built in 1922 and is located in Starland County, 10 miles north of the Michichi turn off on Highway 9 in Alberta, Canada. The School was part of the Drumheller School Division No. 30. Even though it is no longer in use, it has been well maintained by the Springwater Homestead Foundation.

History
Built by a local stonemason, the school was built with all local stones. There were only ten students when the school originally opened. In addition to being a school, the building also hosted many community events, even after closing as a school. In April, 1952, the school was sold to the Majestic Farrell Lake Women's Institute. It was sold for $200 and remained as a community hall.

Film
The 1988 movie Bye Bye Blues was filmed in the area, and the Springwater School was used as a set.

References

External links
Archivescanada.ca
Starlandcounty.com

Defunct schools in Canada
Educational institutions established in 1922
1922 establishments in Alberta